Salvadori is an Italian surname.

Geographical distribution
As of 2014, 76.9% of all known bearers of the surname Salvadori were residents of Italy (frequency 1:4,046), 11.6% of Brazil (1:89,580), 5.3% of France (1:64,135), 2.3% of Argentina (1:93,736) and 1.9% of the United States (1:945,684).

In Italy, the frequency of the surname was higher than national average (1:4,046) in the following regions:
 1. Tuscany (1:437)
 2. Trentino-Alto Adige/Südtirol (1:1,132)
 3. Veneto (1:2,947)
 4. Aosta Valley (1:3,443)

People
Giulio Salvadori (1862–1928), Italian educator
Mario Salvadori (1907–1997), Italian structural engineer and educator 
Massimo Salvadori, or Max Salvadori (1908-1992), Anglo-Italian historian
Pierre Salvadori (b. 1964), a French film director born in Tunisia 
Roy Salvadori (1922-2012), English motor racing driver
Tommaso Salvadori (1835–1923), Italian zoologist and ornithologist.

References

Italian-language surnames
Surnames of Italian origin